Devan (R. Mahadevan) (8 September 1913 – 5 May 1958) was a 20th-century Indian writer who wrote in Tamil, known for his witty and humorous stories.

Early life
Devan was born in 1913 at Thiruvidaimarudur in Thanjavur district, Tamil Nadu, India, where he did his schooling. He came to Kumbakonam Government College to complete his B.A. degree. He worked as a school teacher for a year, before joining the popular Tamil weekly magazine, Ananda Vikatan in 1933. Devan's first foray into the world of writing was through the humorous short story "Mister Rajamani", written when he was in his twenties.

Life as an editor
Devan started as a Sub-Editor at Ananda Vikatan in 1933. After Kalki Krishnamurthy left Vikatan, worked as Managing Editor from 1942 to 1957.

During this time, he wrote about 20 serials, more than 500 stories, articles and travelogues. A common feature in all his works was his gentle sense of humour. He was a very popular writer and stories abound of how, when a new issue of Ananda Vikatan came out, everyone in the family would fight to get hold of the copy first.

Devan worked under famous writers like Kalki Krishnamurthy and S. S. Vasan. It was his wish that his stories get published as books, but sadly this did not happen in his lifetime, due to the nature of his contract with Vikatan.

During this time, he also served as Chairman of the Tamil Writers' Guild twice, and helped to promote Tamil literature.

Devan was the editor of Ananda Vikatan until his death in 1957. In his short life, he experimented with different types of writing – travelogues, detective novels, articles, short stories, current affairs. Devan's books are a joy to read even today, when social values and techniques in fiction writing are so different.

About ten of Devan's writings were also dramatised by several Tamil drama troupes, even during his lifetime. He himself wrote most of the dialogues for the plays. More recently, some of his works like Thuppariyum Sambu, Sriman Sudharsanam and Mister Vedhantham were made into television serials also. Only one of his novels, gOmathiyin kAdhalan, was made into a movie, starring T. R. Ramachandran and Savithri.

Bibliography
All of Devan's stories and travelogues were serialised in Ananda Vikatan (with, perhaps, one exception, 'Mythili' which was serialised in 'Naradar'). His writings are copyright of the Devan Endowments. Recently, many of Devan's works have been published by Alliance Publishers, Chennai, India. 'Kizakkup padhippagam' has also recently started publishing Devan's writings.
One of his novels, Justice Jagannathan, has been translated into English.

His writings include :

Novels:
 Mythili (1939 )
 Malathi ( 1942)
 Thuppariyum Sambu (1942)
 GOmathiyin KAdhalan
 KalyANi (1944)
 Miss JAnaki
 SrimAn Sudharsanam
 Mr VedhAntham (1949–50)
 Justice JagannAthan (1953–54)
 Lakshmi KatAksham (1951–52)
 CID Chandru (his last novel) (1955–56 )

Other collections of stories, articles and travelogues include:
 Mister RajAmaNi – a series
 Vichuvukku Kadithangal – a series
 AppaLak KachchEri – a series of articles with a recipe at the end of each article
 Aindhu NaadugaLil ARupathu NaaL (60 Days in 5 countries) – Travelogue
 POkkiri MAmA
 PallisAmiyin Thuppu
 MOtAr AgarAthi
 Chinna KaNNan katturaigaL – a series
 RAjiyin PiLLai – a series
 Adhisaya thaambathigaL – a series
 Kamalam SolgirAL – a series
 Podaatha Thapaal – a series
 Sarasuvukku Kadithangal
 manidha subAvam
 chInup payal
 chinnan chiRu kadhaigaL – a series
 pArvathiyin sangalpam
 mallAri rAo kadhaigaL – a series
 En indha asattuththanam
 jAngiri sundharam
 peyarpOna puLugugaL
 prabuvE! uththaravu! – a series
 nadandhathu nadanthapadiyE – a travelogue
 rangUn periyappA
 chonnapadi kELungaL
 rAjaththin manOratham – a series on building a house

References

 "dEvanin ezuththulagam" Tamil Book by S. Vaitheeswaran, vAnathi publishers, April 1995.
 Prefaces in Devan's books published by Alliance Publishers.
  Books listed by Tamilbooksonline

External links
 
 
 
 Murder Mystery 
 Kalki and Devan 
 Devan's house 
 A mirror to human nature 
 Devan day 2007 
 Devan day: 2008
 Devan day:2010 
 First Devan memorial lecture 
 Wodehousian or just William? 
 The Devan days 
 He made people laugh 
 Remembering a literary genius  
 Fine Insight into Human Psychology 

1913 births
1957 deaths
Tamil-language writers
Children's writers in Tamil
People from Thanjavur district
Indian children's writers
20th-century Indian writers
Indian short story writers
Indian travel writers